The dusky-backed jacamar (Brachygalba salmoni) is a species of bird in the family Galbulidae. It is found in Colombia and Panama.

Taxonomy and systematics

The dusky-backed jacamar is monotypic. It and the pale-headed (B. goeringi), brown (B. lugubris), and white-throated jacamars (B. albogularis) form a superspecies.

Description

Males weigh  and females . The male's upper parts, chest, and flanks are dark greenish black that appears bluish when worn. Its cheeks are sooty, the throat white or whitish, and the belly and breast cinnamon. The female is similar but its throat is buff.

Distribution and habitat

The dusky-backed jacamar is found in Panama's Darién Province and the adjoining and nearby northern Chocó, northern Antioquia, and southern Córdoba Departments of Colombia. There is also an isolated population in northern Bolívar Department, Colombia, that at one time was thought to be a subspecies. It inhabits humid primary and secondary forest. It is found in edges, such as by clearings and along streams, rather than the forest interior.

Behavior

Feeding

The dusky-backed jacamar preys on a variety of flying insects that it catches by flying from a perch. It often perches and hunts in pairs or small family groups.

Breeding

Though the dusky-backed jacamar is assumed to nest in burrows in earth banks, there is no documentation of its breeding phenology. Birds in breeding condition were noted during January and February in Colombia.

Vocalization

The dusky-backed jacamar has a complex song . Its call is described as an "upwardly inflected 'sweet' or 'feet'...sometimes expanded to...a longer series" .

Status

The IUCN has assessed the dusky-backed jacamar as being of Least Concern. It is scarce overall but locally common in its small range, though it "[t]olerates, or perhaps even prefers, a degree of habitat disturbance". The isolated Bolívar population might be vulnerable to habitat destruction.

References

dusky-backed jacamar
Birds of Panama
Birds of Colombia
dusky-backed jacamar
dusky-backed jacamar
dusky-backed jacamar
Taxonomy articles created by Polbot